The 150th Division()(1st Formation) was created in January 1949 under the Regulation of the Redesignations of All Organizations and Units of the Army, issued by Central Military Commission on November 1, 1948, basing on the 52nd Temporary Division, 60th Corps of Republic of China Army defected in Changchun.

The division was a part of 50th Corps.

In August 1949 the division was disbanded and absorbed by 148th and 149th Divisions from the same Corps.

References

中国人民解放军各步兵师沿革，http://blog.sina.com.cn/s/blog_a3f74a990101cp1q.html

150
Military units and formations established in 1949
Military units and formations disestablished in 1949